Denis Alekseyevich Davydov (born 22 March 1995) is a Russian professional footballer who plays as a winger or second striker for Khimki.

Club career
He made his debut in the Russian Premier League for FC Spartak Moscow on 28 September 2013 in a game against FC Zenit St. Petersburg.

On 19 February 2019, he was released from his contract by FC Spartak Moscow by mutual consent.

On 27 February 2019, he signed with FC Nizhny Novgorod.

On 28 May 2019, he joined Bulgarian club CSKA Sofia. After featuring only on rare occasions for the team, Davidov decided to cancel his contract with the "redmen" in the spring of 2020.

On 18 September 2020, he signed with Tom Tomsk.

On 14 July 2022, Davydov signed with Khimki.

Career statistics

International
Davydov made his debut for the Russia national football team on 31 March 2015 in a friendly game against Kazakhstan.

References

External links

1995 births
Footballers from Moscow
Living people
Russian footballers
Association football forwards
Association football wingers
Russia youth international footballers
Russia under-21 international footballers
Russia international footballers
FC Spartak-2 Moscow players
FC Spartak Moscow players
FK Mladá Boleslav players
FK Spartaks Jūrmala players
FC Nizhny Novgorod (2015) players
PFC CSKA Sofia players
FC Tom Tomsk players
FC Znamya Truda Orekhovo-Zuyevo players
FC Khimki players
Russian Second League players
Russian Premier League players
Russian First League players
Latvian Higher League players
First Professional Football League (Bulgaria) players
Russian expatriate footballers
Expatriate footballers in the Czech Republic
Russian expatriate sportspeople in the Czech Republic
Expatriate footballers in Latvia
Russian expatriate sportspeople in Latvia
Expatriate footballers in Bulgaria
Russian expatriate sportspeople in Bulgaria